Pharaoh Finger Snail was an ancient Egyptian ruler from the pre-dynastic period of prehistoric Egypt. It is disputed whether he really existed as the reading of his name as a king's name is far from certain. Most scholars do not read the known signs as a king's name. He may have been the first king of a united upper Egypt.

The name is preserved in the inscriptions in the tomb U-j of King Scorpion I in Umm el-Qa'ab.

References

People whose existence is disputed
Year of birth unknown
Year of death unknown
Predynastic pharaohs